The Tumcha is a river in the south of the Kola Peninsula in Murmansk Oblast, Russia. The river originates in the confluence of the rivers Kutsayoki and Tuntsayoki and flows into the Iova Reservoir which is drained by the Kovda.

Rivers of Murmansk Oblast